The US Post Office—Winchester Main is a historic post office at 48 Waterfield Road in Winchester, Massachusetts. The single-story Classical Revival brick building was built in 1927 and 1928 by John P. Curley for the United States Postal Service. The building features neo-Classical temple fronts on its three principal facades, with a more elaborate projecting instance on the long south-facing facade, where the main entrance is located. The cornice has a simple dentil moulding in limestone; the roof is flat, but there is a raised clerestory section in the center.

The building was listed on the National Register of Historic Places in 1987, and included in the Winchester Center Historic District in 1986.

See also 

National Register of Historic Places listings in Winchester, Massachusetts
List of United States post offices

References 

Winchester
Buildings and structures in Winchester, Massachusetts
National Register of Historic Places in Winchester, Massachusetts
Historic district contributing properties in Massachusetts